Karl Friedrich Wilhelm Wallroth (13 March 1792 in Breitenstein, Saxony-Anhalt – 22 March 1857 in Nordhausen) was a German botanist. His name is abbreviated Wallr. as a taxon authority.

He attended classes in medicine and botany at the University of Halle, afterwards continuing his studies in Göttingen, where he was a pupil of botanist Heinrich Adolf Schrader (1767-1836). In 1816 he obtained his medical doctorate at the University of Göttingen. In 1822 he was appointed district physician to the city of Nordhausen, where along with his duties as a doctor, he performed botanical research.

Among his writings were a treatise on cryptogams native to Germany, Flora Cryptogamica Germaniae (1831–33), and a study on the biology of lichens, titled Naturgeschichte der Flechten (1825 and 1827).

See also
 :Category:Taxa named by Karl Friedrich Wilhelm Wallroth

References

1792 births
1857 deaths
19th-century German botanists
German lichenologists
People from Mansfeld-Südharz
University of Halle alumni
University of Göttingen alumni